Chairman Kim may refer to:
Kim Il-sung (1912–1994), former Chairman of the Workers' Party of Korea (1949-1966)
Kim Jong-il (1941–2011), former Chairman of the National Defence Commission (1993-2011)
Kim Jong-un (1984- ), current Chairman of the Workers' Party of Korea and Chairman of the State Affairs Commission